Kim Seok-won (born 7 November 1960) is a Korean football forward who played for South Korea in the 1984 Asian Cup. He also played for Yukong Elephants.

International Records

References

External links

South Korean footballers
South Korea international footballers
1960 births
Living people
K League 1 players
Jeju United FC players
Korea University alumni
Association football forwards